Wutangguangchang station is a station of Line 3 of the Nanjing Metro. It started operations on 1 April 2015. It is one of nine stations on Line 3 that are decorated with a Dream of the Red Chamber theme.

References

Railway stations in Jiangsu
Railway stations in China opened in 2015
Nanjing Metro stations